Custódio Ribeiro Ezequiel (born 28 March 1962 in Alcochete) is a Portuguese sport shooter. He was selected to compete for Portugal in two editions of the Olympic Games (2000 and 2004), and also produced a career tally of three medals, two golds and one bronze, at the ISSF World Cup series. Ezequiel is a member of Vilamoura Shooting Club.

Ezequiel's Olympic debut came at the 2000 Summer Olympics in Sydney, where he marked 111 out of 125 targets to force a four-way tie with Italy's Rodolfo Vigano, Ireland's Derek Burnett, and United Arab Emirates' Ahmed Al Maktoum for eighteenth place in the men's trap.

At the 2004 Summer Olympics in Athens, Ezequiel qualified for his second Portuguese team in trap shooting, after having achieved a minimum qualifying score of 123 from his remarkable top finish at the ISSF World Cup meet in Granada, Spain a year earlier. Ezequiel fell out of his previous Olympic feat to finish in a four-way tie with Turkey's Oğuzhan Tüzün, India's Mansher Singh, and Singapore's Lee Wung Yew for twenty-first position, firing a matching score of 111.

References

External links
ISSF Profile

1962 births
Living people
Portuguese male sport shooters
Olympic shooters of Portugal
Shooters at the 2000 Summer Olympics
Shooters at the 2004 Summer Olympics
People from Alcochete
Sportspeople from Setúbal District